The Amish Paste heirloom tomato is a plum tomato of Amish origins, that is used for cooking, although it can be eaten raw.

History
The Amish Paste tomato is said to have originated in the 1870s with the oldest Amish community in Wisconsin; Medford.

It rose to fame once acquired by Tom Hauch of Heirloom Seeds organization, from the Amish of Lancaster County, Pennsylvania, and was first distributed nationally in the Seed Savers edition 1987, by Thane Earle of Whitewater.

The plant
It varies widely in shape, from "oxheart" to plum, and though coreless, is somewhat seedier and sweeter than normal paste cultivars. They tend to ripen 80 to 85 days after planting.

The plant is an indeterminate variety, growing continually until it dies (like all tomato plants, it's a delicate perennial, that would not die if growing in the warm climate to which tomatoes are native). Because it has relatively sparse foliage, the fruit is more exposed to sunlight than a normal plant, making sunscald an issue.

References

Tomato cultivars
Horticulture